Mark Daniel Coleman (born December 20, 1964) is an American retired mixed martial artist, professional wrestler and amateur wrestler. Coleman was the UFC 10 and UFC 11 tournament champion, the first UFC Heavyweight Champion, and the Pride Fighting Championships 2000 Open Weight Grand Prix champion. At UFC 82 Coleman was inducted into the UFC Hall of Fame.

Coleman is credited with proving the ability of wrestlers to dominate in the developing sport of mixed martial arts, and with being one of the first in American MMA to use the strategy that he coined ground-and-pound successfully, earning him the moniker, "The Godfather of Ground & Pound". In the sport of wrestling, Coleman was a World Championship runner-up and Pan American Games Gold medalist in 1991, won three Pan American Championships, competed at the 1992 Summer Olympics and was an NCAA Division I National Champion for the Ohio State Buckeyes.

Background
Coleman was born in Fremont, Ohio, U.S. in 1964. He began freestyle wrestling as a teenager and in 1981 was the first state champion wrestler for Saint Joseph Central Catholic High School (Fremont, Ohio). He then finished second in his sophomore year before claiming his second state championship in 1983.

He continued to wrestle for Miami University, in Ohio, where he was a two-time Mid-American Conference wrestling champion and earned his first All-American honors in 1986. In his senior year, he transferred to The Ohio State University and won an NCAA championship in 1988. Out of college, he started as an assistant coach at his alma mater. Additionally, he was awarded a spot on the US Wrestling team, placing second (100 kg) at the 1991 FILA Wrestling World Championships in Varna, Bulgaria, and placing seventh overall in the 1992 Summer Olympics in Barcelona, Spain. He participated 1996 Olympic Trials, but self-claimed lack of focus on wrestling hindered his performance, resulting in a loss in the semifinals.

Mixed martial arts career
Facing the twilight of his amateur wrestling career, Coleman transitioned to the then-new sport of mixed martial arts after accidentally turning on a TV channel where the UFC 1 was ongoing.

Ultimate Fighting Championship
Coleman won his first two tournaments in dominating fashion, including a win over UFC 8 champion Don Frye at UFC 10 in 1996, and becoming the first UFC Heavyweight Champion after submitting UFC Superfight Champion Dan Severn via neck crank submission at UFC 12.

Coleman made his first UFC Heavyweight Championship title defense at UFC 14, facing kickboxer (and heavy underdog) Maurice Smith. In the pre-fight interview with Joe Rogan, Coleman stated "I'm going to ground him and pound the goddamn shit out of him" thus coining the name ground-and-pound. In what turned out to be a long battle, Coleman lost a decision after 21:00 (regulation plus two overtimes). This was considered to be one of the largest upsets in UFC history at that time, largely because of the way Coleman had dominated his opponents in his previous fights.

Coleman took nearly a year off after having to get ACL surgery and returned at UFC 17. Coleman was originally scheduled to face Randy Couture in a title match for the UFC Heavyweight Championship, but Couture was injured during training and was forced to pull out of the fight. Coleman instead faced a relatively unknown (at that time) last-minute replacement fighter, up and coming Lion's Den product Pete Williams. In what turned out to be another long and strenuous battle, Coleman appeared to be completely exhausted after 10 minutes; he was fatigued to the point of resting his hands on his knees during the fight. Williams took advantage of Coleman's fatigue and landed a heavy kick to the face, knocking 'The Hammer' out for the first time in his career.

After his loss to Pete Williams, Coleman went to train with former UFC champion Ken Shamrock and his Lion's Den training camp for his upcoming bout with feared Brazilian striker Pedro Rizzo at UFC 18. The fight with Rizzo was part of the "Road to the Heavyweight Title", which was a four-man tournament between Coleman, Rizzo, Bas Rutten and Tsuyoshi Kosaka that would crown the next UFC Heavyweight Champion. After 15:00 the fight went to the judges, and they awarded a split decision win to Rizzo. The decision was controversial, with many and Coleman himself believing he did enough to win. In a recent interview, Coleman said he still feels the effects of the controversial decision loss to Rizzo.

Pride Fighting Championships
From 1999 through 2006, The Hammer continued his career with Japanese promotion, Pride Fighting Championships while also making appearances with the professional wrestling promotion HUSTLE.

At Pride 5, Coleman fought Nobuhiko Takada, who would become HUSTLE's owner and booker. Though thought to be the much better fighter, Coleman was caught by a heel hook from Takada and submitted. The validity of this fight has been questioned, with many believing the fight was fixed. In response to questions about the fight's legitimacy, Coleman said, "It was what it was. I needed to support my family. They guaranteed me another fight after that and I needed that security. It was what it was. I'm going to leave it at that."

Coleman won the Pride 2000 Open Weight Grand Prix tournament defeating Masaaki Satake, Akira Shoji, Kazuyuki Fujita, and Igor Vovchanchyn. The final was scheduled to be fought with a 20-minute time limit but according to Coleman, the day before the fight the rules were changed to no time limit. The change forced him to modify his game plan to attempt a quick finish as he did not believe he could put Vovchanchyn away with his ground and pound in a long match. The Hammer's training and 2000 tournament victory are depicted in the documentary The Smashing Machine: The Life and Times of Extreme Fighter Mark Kerr.

After a quick TKO victory over Allan Goes at Pride 13 - Collision Course, Coleman faced possibly his toughest challenge ever in Antônio Rodrigo Nogueira at Pride 16.  "Minotauro" was able to catch the Hammer in a triangle/armbar at 6:10 of the first round, breaking Coleman's six-fight winning streak.

Coleman would take nearly two years off following the fight with Nogueira, spending time with his wife and children, and focusing on developing his martial arts training facility and stable of fighters at Team Hammer House. Training such notable fighters as Kevin Randleman, Wes Sims and Phil Baroni, Team Hammer House quickly gained a reputation of turning out world-class fighters.

Mark Coleman returned to MMA competition at Pride 26 to face Don Frye in a rematch of their meeting at UFC 10; this proved to be a much tougher battle. Coming back from a career-threatening neck injury, Coleman ultimately won a unanimous decision victory after 20 minutes. Following the fight, Coleman apologized to the fans for the lack of action during the fight, in which he had spent the majority of the time taking down and maintaining positional dominance of Frye with his superior wrestling ability.

Between training fighters and spending time with his family, the Hammer was now fighting roughly once a year. He returned to competition to take place in the Pride 2004 Heavyweight Grand Prix, as the returning Grand Prix champion in the Open Weight Division. His first-round match at Pride Total Elimination 2004 was against Pride heavyweight champion Fedor Emelianenko. In what turned out to be a short bout, Coleman was submitted by armbar at 2:11 of the first round, eliminating him from the tournament.

Coleman returned to the Pride ring in February 2005, this time facing Mirko Cro Cop at Pride 29: Fists of Fire. Suffering the second knockout of his career, the Hammer fell to strikes by Cro Cop in the first round. In November 2005, Mark Coleman appeared in Bushido Europe-Rotterdam Rumble, Europe's first Bushido event, and choked out Milco Voorn at 0:56 of the first round.

The Hammer returned to action at Pride 31 with a victory over Chute Boxe team member Maurício "Shogun" Rua after the fight was stopped when Shogun suffered a dislocated elbow during a Coleman takedown. With Team Hammer House member Phil Baroni in his corner, Coleman began the match by taking Shogun to the ground. At 0:49 of the first round, Rua got up and as he took the first step Coleman grabbed his feet. Rua fell and broke his arm. Coleman then started peppering Rua with strikes before the referee stopped the fight.

Backstage in his post-fight interview, Coleman stated that the whole melee happened in the heat of the moment and that he did not blame the Chute Boxe team for coming in and backing their fighter. He then added that similar to Chute Boxe, Hammer House is also like a family, and thanked Baroni for coming in and watching his back. An outraged Chute Boxe refused to accept Coleman's backstage apology. The Chute Boxe team was assigned a yellow card for instigating this infraction. Coleman's contract was fought out at this point, and he subsequently re-signed with the organization.

On October 21, 2006, Mark Coleman again faced Pride heavyweight champion Fedor Emelianenko at Pride's first American show, Pride 32: The Real Deal, and lost via submission (armbar) at 1:17 of round two.

Mark Coleman appeared with teammate, Kevin Randleman, on the US pay-per-view broadcast of the final Pride event, Pride 34: Kamikaze, stating that he intended to keep fighting.

Return to UFC (2008–2010)
At UFC 82, Mark Coleman was inducted into the UFC Hall of Fame, making him the 5th inductee. Coleman announced that he was not retiring and would return to the octagon to fight Brock Lesnar on August 9 in Minneapolis at UFC 87. However, Coleman injured his knee while training, and was forced to pull out of the event. Heath Herring replaced Coleman for the fight.

At UFC 109, Coleman faced fellow UFC Hall of Famer Randy Couture, after originally being scheduled to meet at UFC 17 in 1998 twelve years prior, in which an injury forced Couture to drop out of the fight. Coleman went on record, multiple times during the build-up for the fight, in which he claimed this was his dream bout. After being outboxed on the feet, Coleman was taken down and defeated shortly after by (Rear Naked Choke) at 1:09 in round 2. The bout marked the first time two UFC Hall of Fame inductees had fought.

Following Coleman's loss to Couture in the main event of UFC 109, his sixth loss in his last 10 fights, he was released by the promotion.

Retirement from MMA
After going over three years without competing Coleman announced via Facebook that he has officially retired from MMA competition at 48 years of age.

Professional wrestling career

New Japan Pro-Wrestling and All Japan Pro Wrestling (2000-2002)
In December 2000, Coleman had his first professional wrestling match when he was invited to the event Inoki Bom-Ba-Ye 2000, teaming up with Mark Kerr to defeat Takashi Iizuka and Yuji Nagata. He would also appear for New Japan Pro-Wrestling, defeating Nagata in a singles match. In 2002, Coleman would appear in All Japan Pro Wrestling's Wrestle-1 project, teaming up with Kevin Randleman to face Hiroshi Hase and Satoshi Kojima in a losing effort, and later Jan the Giant Convict and Singh the Giant Convict in a victory, with Coleman himself pinning Singh with a hurricanrana.

Hustle (2004-2007)
In 2004, Coleman started wrestling for Hustle and its partner promotion Pro Wrestling Zero-One. He debuted in the first as part of Generalissimo Takada's villainous faction Monster Army, going against babyface Toshiaki Kawada in a singles match which Mark lost by TKO. Coleman continued teaming up with other Monster Army wrestlers, including Dan Bobish, Commander An Jo and Giant Silva, but he was kicked out of the stable after failing to defeat top face Naoya Ogawa, thus becoming a babyface himself. Coleman then went free and ended up joining Wataru Sakata's team after losing a bout to him. Coleman and Sakata were successful as a tag team, but it was dissolved after Coleman left the promotion in 2005.

Two years later, Coleman returned to Hustle under the masked persona "Coleman", teaming up with the superhero-like team of Randleman, Kintaman and Kurodaman. Their biggest victory was when Coleman and Randleman faced the trio of Giant Vabo, Kohei Sato and Tajiri and won the match despite the numeric disadvantage. Mark's last match in Hustle was in July 2007, leaving the promotion again afterwards.

From 2008 to 2010, Coleman was a usual member of Inoki Genome Federation, wrestling names like Naoya Ogawa, Tadao Yasuda and Shinichi Suzukawa.

Personal life
Coleman has two daughters, Mackenzie and Morgan, from his previous marriage. Coleman has a third daughter, Skylar, with his current partner Tina.

He appeared in the documentary The Smashing Machine: The Life and Times of Mark Kerr alongside fellow fighter and former friend Mark Kerr.

In June 2006, it was announced that Coleman was one of the new coaches in the International Fight League. However his team, the Columbus Razorclaws, were unable to get off the ground, and he was replaced as a coach by Frank Shamrock the following month.

In 2020, Coleman revealed that he was one of the victims of Dr. Richard Strauss regarding the Ohio State University abuse scandal.

In late 2020, Coleman reported that he suffered a heart attack due to a complete artery blockage, and underwent a surgery to have a stent installed.

In an interview with Ariel Helwani in September 2021, Coleman revealed that Wes Sims persuaded him to participate in rehab due to a drinking problem. In the interview Coleman stated that multiple personal life issues contributed to the situation and also that he's been sober since the rehab.

Championships and accomplishments

Mixed martial arts
Ultimate Fighting Championship
UFC Hall of Fame (pioneer wing, 2008)
UFC Heavyweight Championship (1 Time, first)
UFC 10 Tournament Champion
UFC 11 Tournament Champion
 Fight of the Night (One time) vs. Maurício Rua
UFC Viewer's Choice Award
PRIDE Fighting Championships
Pride 2000 Grand Prix Openweight Tournament Winner
Fastest win in PRIDE Fighting Championships History (0:02)
One of only two fighters to win Tournaments in both Pride FC and UFC
Wrestling Observer Newsletter
Fight of the Year (1997)  vs. Maurice Smith on July 27

Amateur wrestling
 1986 NCAA Division I Championships: (190 lbs 4th Place)
 1988 NCAA Big Ten Championships:  (190 lbs 1st Place)
 1988 NCAA Division I Championships: (190 lbs 1st Place)
 1990 Pan American Championships Freestyle Wrestling: (90 kg 1st Place)
 1991 Pan American Championships Freestyle Wrestling: (100 kg 1st Place)
 1991 Pan American Games Freestyle Wrestling: (100 kg 1st Place)
 1991 U.S.A. National Freestyle Wrestling Championships: (100 kg 1st Place)
 1991 FILA World Freestyle Wrestling Championships: (100 kg 2nd Place)
 1992 Pan American Championships Freestyle Wrestling: (100 kg 1st place)
 1992 Summer Olympics Freestyle Wrestling: (100 kg 7th Place)

Mixed martial arts record

|-
| Loss
| align=center| 16–10
| Randy Couture
| Submission (rear-naked choke)
| UFC 109
| 
| align=center| 2
| align=center| 1:09
| Las Vegas, Nevada, United States
| 
|-
| Win
| align=center| 16–9
| Stephan Bonnar
| Decision (unanimous)
| UFC 100
| 
| align=center| 3
| align=center| 5:00
| Las Vegas, Nevada, United States
| 
|-
| Loss
| align=center| 15–9
| Maurício Rua
| TKO (punches)
| UFC 93
| 
| align=center| 3
| align=center| 4:36
| Dublin, Ireland
| 
|-
| Loss
| align=center| 15–8
| Fedor Emelianenko
| Submission (armbar)
| PRIDE 32: The Real Deal
| 
| align=center| 2
| align=center| 1:15
| Las Vegas, Nevada, United States
| 
|-
| Win
| align=center| 15–7
| Maurício Rua
| TKO (broken arm)
| Pride 31 - Dreamers
| 
| align=center| 1
| align=center| 0:49
| Saitama, Saitama, Japan
| 
|-
| Win
| align=center| 14–7
| Milco Voorn
| Submission (arm-triangle choke)
| Bushido Europe: Rotterdam Rumble
| 
| align=center| 1
| align=center| 0:56
| Rotterdam, South Holland, Netherlands
| 
|-
| Loss
| align=center| 13–7
| Mirko Cro Cop
| KO (punches and soccer kick)
| PRIDE 29
| 
| align=center| 1
| align=center| 3:40
| Saitama, Saitama, Japan
| 
|-
| Loss
| align=center| 13–6
| Fedor Emelianenko
| Submission (armbar)
| PRIDE Total Elimination 2004
| 
| align=center| 1
| align=center| 2:11
| Saitama, Saitama, Japan
| 
|-
| Win
| align=center| 13–5
| Don Frye
| Decision (unanimous)
| PRIDE 26
| 
| align=center| 3
| align=center| 5:00
| Yokohama, Kanagawa, Japan
| 
|-
| Loss
| align=center| 12–5
| Antônio Rodrigo Nogueira
| Submission (triangle armbar)
| PRIDE 16
| 
| align=center| 1
| align=center| 6:10
| Osaka, Osaka, Japan
| 
|-
| Win
| align=center| 12–4
| Allan Goes
| KO (knees)
| PRIDE 13: Collision Course
| 
| align=center| 1
| align=center| 1:19
| Saitama, Saitama, Japan
| 
|-
| Win
| align=center| 11–4
| Igor Vovchanchyn
| TKO (submission to knees)
| rowspan=3| PRIDE Grand Prix 2000 Finals
| rowspan=3| 
| align=center| 2
| align=center| 3:09
| rowspan=3| Tokyo, Japan
| 
|-
| Win
| align=center| 10–4
| Kazuyuki Fujita
| TKO (corner stoppage)
| align=center| 1
| align=center| 0:02
| 
|-
| Win
| align=center| 9–4
| Akira Shoji
| Decision (unanimous)
| align=center| 1
| align=center| 15:00
| 
|-
| Win
| align=center| 8–4
| Masaaki Satake
| Submission (can opener)
| PRIDE Grand Prix 2000 Opening Round
| 
| align=center| 1
| align=center| 1:14
| Tokyo, Japan
| 
|-
| Win
| align=center| 7–4
| Ricardo Morais
| Decision (unanimous)
| PRIDE 8
| 
| align=center| 2
| align=center| 10:00
| Tokyo, Japan
| 
|-
| Loss
| align=center| 6–4
| Nobuhiko Takada
| Submission (heel hook)
| PRIDE 5
| 
| align=center| 2
| align=center| 1:44
| Nagoya, Aichi, Japan
| 
|-
| Loss
| align=center| 6–3
| Pedro Rizzo
| Decision (split)
| UFC 18
| 
| align=center| 1
| align=center| 15:00
| New Orleans, Louisiana, United States
| 
|-
| Loss
| align=center| 6–2
| Pete Williams
| KO (head kick)
| UFC 17
| 
| align=center| 1
| align=center| 12:38
| Mobile, Alabama, United States
| 
|-
| Loss
| align=center| 6–1
| Maurice Smith
| Decision (unanimous)
| UFC 14
| 
| align=center| 1
| align=center| 21:00
| Birmingham, Alabama, United States
| 
|-
| Win
| align=center| 6–0
| Dan Severn
| Submission (scarf-hold)
| UFC 12
| 
| align=center| 1
| align=center| 2:57
| Dothan, Alabama, United States
| 
|-
| Win
| align=center| 5–0
| Brian Johnston
| TKO (submission to punches)
| rowspan=2| UFC 11
| rowspan=2| 
| align=center| 1
| align=center| 2:20
| rowspan=2| Augusta, Georgia, United States
| 
|-
| Win
| align=center| 4–0
| Julian Sanchez
| Submission (scarf hold)
| align=center| 1
| align=center| 0:45
| | 
|-
| Win
| align=center| 3–0
| Don Frye
| TKO (punches)
| rowspan=3| UFC 10
| rowspan=3| 
| align=center| 1
| align=center| 11:34
| rowspan=3| Birmingham, Alabama, United States
| 
|-
| Win
| align=center| 2–0
| Gary Goodridge
| Submission (exhaustion)
| align=center| 1
| align=center| 7:00
| 
|-
| Win
| align=center| 1–0
| Moti Horenstein
| TKO (submission to punches)
| align=center| 1
| align=center| 2:43
|

References

External links
UFC.com Hall of Fame Profile

Mark Coleman at wrestlinghalloffame.org
IMDb entry for Smashing Machine

1964 births
American male professional wrestlers
American male mixed martial artists
Mixed martial artists from Ohio
Light heavyweight mixed martial artists
Heavyweight mixed martial artists
Mixed martial artists utilizing collegiate wrestling
Mixed martial artists utilizing freestyle wrestling
Living people
Professional wrestlers from Ohio
Ultimate Fighting Championship male fighters
Ultimate Fighting Championship champions
People from Fremont, Ohio
Wrestlers at the 1992 Summer Olympics
American male sport wrestlers
Sportspeople from Columbus, Ohio
Miami RedHawks wrestlers
Ohio State Buckeyes wrestlers
World Wrestling Championships medalists
Pan American Games gold medalists for the United States
Pan American Games medalists in wrestling
Wrestlers at the 1991 Pan American Games
Olympic wrestlers of the United States
Medalists at the 1991 Pan American Games